Hércules de Miranda, commonly known as just Hércules (June 2, 1912 – September 3, 1982), was an association footballer who played forward in the 1938 FIFA World Cup with Brazil.

Career
Hércules was born in Guaxupé, Minas Gerais state. He started his career in 1930, playing for Juventus, leaving the club in 1933, joining São Paulo da Floresta. He moved to Fluminense in the same year, leaving the club in 1941, after winning the Campeonato Carioca in 1936, 1937, 1938, 1940 and in 1941, and scoring 164 goals in 176 games. Hércules de Miranda joined Corinthians in 1942, playing 73 games and scoring 53 goals for the club until his retirement in 1948.

National team
He played six games for Brazil, scoring three goals. Hércules debut defending the national team was a 1938 FIFA World Cup game, played on June 5, 1938, against Poland. Hércules de Miranda scored his first two goals for the Braziln national team on March 10, 1940, against Argentina. His last game defending Brazil was played on March 31, 1940, when his country and Uruguay drew 1–1.

Honors

Club
Fluminense
Campeonato Carioca: 1936, 1937, 1938, 1940, 1941

References

1912 births
1982 deaths
Brazilian footballers
Brazil international footballers
Clube Atlético Juventus players
Fluminense FC players
Sport Club Corinthians Paulista players
1938 FIFA World Cup players
Association football forwards
Sportspeople from Minas Gerais